Leap-The-Dips is a wooden roller coaster which is located at Lakemont Park near Altoona, Pennsylvania. Built in 1902 by the Federal Construction Company and designed by E. Joy Morris, it is the oldest operating roller coaster in the world and believed to be the last surviving side friction roller coaster of the figure-eight variety. 

Leap-the-Dips operated continuously until 1985, when it closed after falling into disrepair. A fund-raising campaign led to its restoration, with refurbishment efforts beginning in 1997 and ending with a grand-reopening in 1999. It was designated a National Historic Landmark in 1996 and received the Coaster Classic and Coaster Landmark awards from American Coaster Enthusiasts.

History
Leap-The-Dips was designed by Edward Joy Morris and constructed by the Federal Construction Company. It opened to the public in 1902 at Lakemont Park. Its figure-eight design was common on side friction roller coasters constructed in the early 1900s, reaching peak popularity in the Roaring Twenties. Leap-The-Dips was one of the few to survive from the era and is considered the oldest operating roller coaster in the world.

The roller coaster endured rough times near the turn of the century. In 1985, the attraction closed as a result of structural integrity concerns and lack of maintenance funds. A fund-raising effort initiated by the American Coaster Enthusiasts (ACE) organization led to the formation of the Leap The Dips Foundation, which accepted private donations and worked with eight local banks along with the Progress Fund to save the roller coaster from demolition. 

Restoration began in 1997 utilizing carpentry techniques that were performed during its original construction, with over seventy percent of the original wood remaining intact. Leap-The-Dips officially reopened to the public on May 31, 1999.

Prior to its restoration by P. Joseph Lehman, Inc., Consulting Engineers, the roller coaster was added to the list of National Register of Historic Places in 1993. Several years later in 1996, it was designated a National Historic Landmark. 

Following its reopening, ACE awarded Leap-The-Dips its two coveted awards, the Coaster Landmark Award and the Coaster Classic Award. 

In early 2017, it was announced that Lakemont Park would undergo a complete restoration and transformation that would require the park to remain closed for one season; however, in 2018, Lakemont Park announced that it would remain closed during the 2018 season with plans to reopen as a "family entertainment location with some amusements" in the summer of 2019.

Description and design
The track is arranged in a figure-eight layout and mounted on wooden trestles. The entry and exit station is an open, hipped-roof pavilion, and cars are stored in a nearby shed when not in use. 

The track's form has been altered very little since its original construction, with portions of the track – mostly wood – being replaced by steel in areas of exceptionally high wear, along with the conversion of the lift chain to steel. The lift mechanism includes a ratchet system to prevent cars from rolling backwards in the event of a chain failure. The ride cars resemble sleighs featuring four flanged wheels underneath and two unflanged wheels projecting to each side. The track traverses two and a half circuits of a figure-eight, passing through the trestle structure at different levels.

Side friction roller coasters were an early innovation in roller coasters which enabled them to run at greater speeds and without a brakeman. Extra wheels were mounted on the sides of the cars to guide their movement on the track. This design became obsolete after World War I when side friction was supplanted by under-track mechanisms, which offered better vehicle security and support for greater speeds.

There were other similar installations including an identical Leap the Dips at Mounds State Park in Anderson, Indiana, which closed in 1929. Very few side friction roller coasters survived into the 1980s, and Leap the Dips at Lakemont is believed to be the last remaining figure-eight model of its kind still in operation.

See also
List of National Historic Landmarks in Pennsylvania
National Register of Historic Places listings in Blair County, Pennsylvania

References

External links

Homepage of the Leap-the-Dips Preservation Foundation
Lakemont Park and Island Waterpark
Leap The Dips front seat on-ride HD POV on YouTube CoasterForce channel.
Circa 1908-1911 Picture of Leap the Dips at Mounds State Park

Roller coasters in Pennsylvania
National Historic Landmarks in Pennsylvania
Buildings and structures on the National Register of Historic Places in Pennsylvania
National Register of Historic Places in Blair County, Pennsylvania